Janine Kerrie Balding was a homicide victim who was abducted, raped and murdered by a homeless gang of five (four youths and an adult) on 8 September 1988, in Sydney, New South Wales, Australia. Balding's murder is often compared to the 1986 murder of Sydney nurse Anita Cobby.

Early life
Balding was born on 7 October 1967 and lived in Wagga Wagga, New South Wales before moving to Sydney and gaining employment as a teller at a branch of the then State Bank of New South Wales on George Street. She was due to marry her fiancé Steven Moran in March 1989.

Abduction and murder
A month before her twenty-first birthday, she was abducted from a Sutherland railway station car park by a group of homeless persons consisting of four males and one female.

These persons were Bronson Blessington, Matthew Elliott, Stephen 'Shorty' Jamieson, Wayne Wilmot and Carol Ann Arrow.

Blessington had met Jamieson and Elliott at a homeless shelter named 'The Station' in the Sydney CBD earlier that day and had proposed "Why don't we get a sheila and rape her?", a quote which became infamously known through Australian news media. The idea was agreed to. Arrow and Wilmot joined in. The victim, who was to be picked at random, became Balding.
The gang of five had earlier approached another female—Christine Moberley—at the same car park, but she became concerned and quickly locked herself in her vehicle and drove home where she reported to her partner the offenders talking with another female near a motor vehicle there. That person was Janine Balding. 
Police, upon being alerted to these incidents, immediately attended the Sutherland Railway Station car park itself, not realising that the earlier encounters had happened in an overflow dirt car park on the opposite side of the rail line. This was the same car park from where Janine Balding had been abducted in the intervening period.

She was driven in her vehicle to the side of the F4 Freeway at Minchinbury in Sydney's west, and during that time was partially stripped of her clothing and raped at knifepoint by Blessington, Jamieson and Elliott. Arrow and Wilmot were in the car but did not rape her. On arrival at Minchinbury, she was again raped. She was then dragged from her vehicle, gagged with a scarf, hog-tied, then lifted over a fence and carried into a paddock by Blessington, Jamieson and Elliott. She was then held down and drowned in a dam on the property.

Convictions
Matthew James Elliott, aged 16 at the time of the murder
Bronson Matthew Blessington, aged 14 at the time of the murder
Stephen Wayne 'Shorty' Jamieson, aged 22 at the time of the murder
Wayne Lindsay Wilmot, aged 15 at the time of the murder
Carol Ann Arrow, aged 15 at the time of the murder

All five members of the group were arrested and charged with Balding's murder. After weeks of deliberations and testimonies, Elliott, Blessington and Jamieson were each given life sentences plus 25 years. Wilmot was sentenced to seven-and-a-half years in jail while Arrow was released on a good behaviour bond, as the pair did not physically participate in the rape and murder.

The sentencing of Blessington and Elliot became a topic of extreme controversy, because at the time they committed the murder and were sentenced, they were aged 14 and 16, respectively—becoming the youngest killers in Australia to be convicted and given the maximum sentence for murder.

In sentencing the defendants, Justice Newman said:

"To sentence people so young to a long term of imprisonment is of course a heavy task. However, the facts surrounding the commission of these crimes are so barbaric that I believe I have no alternative other than to impose upon [these] young prisoners, even despite their age, a life sentence. So grave is the nature of this case that I recommend that none of the prisoners in the matter should ever be released."

This trial was the first in Australian legal history where DNA evidence was tendered - leading to convictions based in part on that evidence.  DNA samples were conveyed to a laboratory in the United Kingdom, which at the time was a world leader in DNA analysis, profiling and comparison. The two scientists from that laboratory who processed the DNA samples were brought to Australia to give evidence in relation to their analyses.
Given its significance in being the first time DNA evidence was tendered in an Australian court, the presiding Judge acceded to a request from the Crown Prosecutor that Police witnesses who were involved in the prosecution case be allowed to be in court prior to giving their evidence, to witness this history-making production of DNA evidence.  Defense counsel did not object.

In 2007, Elliott and Blessington were granted an additional appeal based on a staple missing from their files. Essentially, it was argued, because the Crown indictment was not stapled to the court file, it was not "fixed" to the court file as required by law and the judgement was therefore not technically finalised. The High Court of Australia subsequently rejected this ground of appeal.

In an article published in The Sydney Morning Herald, the crime was classified as a thrill killing.

Sentences

Imprisonment
Stephen Jamieson is currently housed in Goulburn Correctional Centre in maximum security.

Bronson Blessington is currently housed in South Coast Correctional Centre in maximum security. After being sentenced in 1990 at age 16, Blessington served two years in Minda Youth Detention Centre and stated that he had become a born-again Christian. A day after turning 18 he was transferred to Long Bay Correctional Centre where he served some time prior to being transferred to Goulburn Correctional Centre. He served some years there before being transferred to the Mid-North Coast Correctional Centre. In 2012, he was reclassified from maximum security to medium security until July 2015, when he was again reclassified and returned to maximum security.

Matthew Elliott is currently housed in Long Bay Correctional Complex in maximum security. After turning 18, Elliot was transferred to Long Bay Correctional Complex. He was eventually transferred to Goulburn Correctional Centre. In 2007, he was reclassified into medium security and was transferred to Cooma Correctional Centre and participated in programs inside the gaol. Elliott eventually started to self-harm. In July 2015, he was reclassified from medium security back to maximum security and was placed in to Long Bay Correctional Complex.

Wayne Wilmot is currently housed at Long Bay Correctional Complex in maximum security. He is a serial sex offender and was serving sentences for sexual assault and kidnapping.
Wilmot has an extensive criminal history. His first known criminal act was a sexual assault on a woman walking through a park when he was 13, after which he said:

"I've ... got a problem" and "This is not the first time I've done this".
He was released from gaol in 1996 after serving sentences for the kidnapping and sexual assault of Janine Balding in 1988, but was reimprisoned two years later. Since then he has served the majority of his sentence in Lithgow Correctional Centre and has been in trouble whilst there. Wilmot has been charged and convicted for multiple sexual assaults of other male inmates.
On 8 January 2014, he was charged with sexual assault on other inmates.
On 21 June 2019, he was rejected from the Sex Offenders' Program. 
On 25 September 2019, Wilmot was denied his bid for freedom when the Supreme Court imposed a Continuing Detention Order (CDO), keeping him in gaol for another two years.
In 2000, a senior forensic psychiatrist warned the court that Wilmot was "quite incapable of engaging in rehabilitation." Justice Julia Lonergan went against the trend of judges refusing Government applications to keep serious offenders in custody, and ordered that Wilmot not be released.

Further developments
In 1998, Wilmot returned to prison for seven years after an attempted abduction and rape of a young girl in Western Sydney just two years after being released for time served over the accessory to murder of Balding. Wilmot was then linked to an earlier attack on a 19-year-old woman at Leightonfield, New South Wales after undertaking a DNA testing program for prisoners.

In 2003, the NSW Innocence Project (a joint project by the NSW Police Force, the Office of the Director of Public Prosecutions and the Privacy Commissioner) used the latest DNA techniques to review the DNA evidence of the crime. This was done because Jamieson denied taking part in the murder, and one of the murderers had claimed that it was 'Shorty' Wells (rather than 'Shorty' Jamieson) who had committed the murder.

The DNA results demonstrated that Jamieson's DNA was not found in a rectal swab taken from the victim at autopsy, and neither was the DNA of Wells. Police Minister John Watkins announced that the NSW Innocence Project would be suspended. Arrow subsequently stated that Jamieson was one of the murderers.

In late October 2014, the United Nations Human Rights Committee ruled that the sentences of Blessington (14 when the crime was committed) and Elliott (16) breached the International Covenant on Civil and Political Rights and the UN Convention on the Rights of the Child. The Committee asked the Australian Government to "review the case and remedy the human rights breach".

In February 2016, Blessington lodged an appeal to be released from prison given he was only 14 at the time he committed the murder. Blessington claimed "he found God", that he was remorseful for his actions and was a changed man. Despite these claims, Janine's family reported that nearly three decades on from the murder, it had not received any formal apology or letter from Blessington expressing such remorse and did not believe he had changed.

Janine's mother Beverley co-wrote, with journalist Janette Fife-Yeomans, a book entitled The Janine Balding Story – A Journey Through A Mother's Nightmare, in which she relates how her family coped with the loss of Janine, of the police investigations and the lengthy trials. In October 2013—shortly after what would have been Janine's 46th birthday—and after suffering from and battling two-and-a-half years of depression, Beverley Balding died after a short stay in hospital. She is buried alongside her daughter in the Wagga Lawn Cemetery.

Media
An episode of the documentary series Crime Investigation Australia was devoted to the case.

See also
Allan Baker and Kevin Crump
Bega schoolgirl murders
List of kidnappings
List of solved missing person cases
Murder of Ebony Simpson
Murder of Sian Kingi
Thrill killing

References

External links
Regina v Matthew James Elliot and Bronson Matthew Blessington, New South Wales Supreme Court of Appeal, 22 September 2006

1967 births
1980s in Sydney
1980s missing person cases
1988 murders in Australia
1988 deaths
Australian murder victims
Deaths by person in Australia
Female murder victims
Kidnapping in Australia
Missing person cases in Australia
Murder committed by minors
Murder in Sydney
Place of birth missing
People from Wagga Wagga
People murdered in Sydney
Rape in Australia
September 1988 events in Australia
Women in Sydney
Violence against women in Australia